Speenghar Tigers ( Spīn Ghar Zmaryān) or Speenghar Region (alternative spelling: Spin Ghar) is one of eight regional first-class cricket teams in Afghanistan. The region represents the following provinces in the east of Afghanistan, to the east of the capital Kabul: Nangarhar, Laghman, Kapisa, Kunar and Nuristan. The team is named after Spīn Ghar, a mountain range in the region.

Speenghar Region compete in the Ahmad Shah Abdali 4-day Tournament, which has had first-class status from 2017 onwards. In October 2017, they won their opening fixture of the tournament, against Amo Region, by an innings and 46 runs.

They also play in the Ghazi Amanullah Khan Regional One Day Tournament, which was granted List A status from 2017. and the Afghan Shpageeza Cricket League Twenty20 competition (which has Twenty20 status from 2017) using the name Speenghar Tigers.

References 

Cricket in Afghanistan
Afghan first-class cricket teams